An investor profile or style defines an individual's preferences in investment decisions, for example:
 Short-term trading (active management) or long term holding (buy and hold)
 Risk-averse or risk tolerant / seeker
 All classes of assets or just one (stocks for example)
 Value stock, growth stocks, quality stocks, defensive or cyclical stocks...
 Big cap or small cap (Market capitalization) stocks, 
 Use or not of derivatives
 Home turf or international diversification
 Hands on, or via investment funds

What determines an investor profile 
The style / profile is determined by

Objective traits
 Objective personal or social traits such as age, gender, income, wealth, family, tax situation, opportunities.

Subjective attitudes

 Subjective attitudes, linked to the temper (emotions) and the beliefs (cognition) of the investor.

Balance between risk and return 

An investor's style is shaped by his or her sense of balance between risk and return.  Some investors can tolerate greater risk to have greater return.  Some investors want less risk and are content with a reasonable return.

 Generally, the investor's financial return / risk objectives, assuming they are precisely set and fully rational. (???)

Areas of focus
An investor profile is shaped by the area that an investor chooses to focus on; such as:
 stocks or bonds,
 technology, commodity, or real estate
 small-cap or large-cap companies

Investment strategies
An investor profile is also shaped by the strategy the investor uses:
 ethical investing
 growth investing
 index investing
 quality investing
 value investing

Valuation methods
An investor profile is also shaped by the valuation method the investor uses:
 fundamental analysis
 technical analysis
 quantitative analysis

See also
 Capital accumulation
 Capital appreciation
 Ethical investing
 Financial economics
 Global assets under management
 Growth investing
 Index investing
 Investor relations
 Quality investing
 Return on investment
 Saving
 Socially responsible investing
 Speculation
 Stock investor
 Stock profile
 Value investing

References

External links 
perso.orange.fr, investor types

Investment